The Boeing Model 247 is an early United States airliner, and one of the first such aircraft to incorporate advances such as all-metal (anodized aluminum) semimonocoque construction, a fully cantilevered wing, and retractable landing gear. Other advanced features included control surface trim tabs, an autopilot and de-icing boots for the wings and tailplane. The 247 first flew on February 8, 1933, and entered service later that year.

Design and development

Boeing had eclipsed other aviation manufacturers by introducing a host of aerodynamic and technical features into a commercial airliner. This advanced design, which was a progression from earlier Monomail (Models 200, 221, 221A) and B-9 bomber designs, combined speed and safety. The Boeing 247 was faster than the U.S. premier fighter aircraft of its day, the Boeing P-12, which was an open-cockpit biplane.

The 247 was able to fly on one engine. With controllable-pitch propellers (standard equipment on the 247D), the 247 could maintain  at maximum gross takeoff weight on one engine. Aside from its size and the wing spar obstructing the cabin, its combination of features became the standard for the Douglas DC-1 and other airliners before World War II. Originally planned as a 14-passenger airliner powered by Pratt & Whitney R-1690 Hornet radial engines, the preliminary review of the design concept by United Air Lines' pilots had resulted in a redesign to a smaller, less capable configuration, powered by R-1340 Wasp engines.

One concern of the pilots was that no airfield then in existence, in their view, could safely take an eight-ton aircraft. They also objected to the use of Hornet engines, as the Hornet had a problem with detonation when running on the available low octane fuel, and suffered from excessive vibration. Pratt & Whitney's chief engineer, George Mead, knew the problem would be resolved eventually, but P&W's president, Frederick Rentschler acquiesced to the airline pilots' unanimous demand. The decision created a rift between Mead and Rentschler. Despite the disagreements, the 247 would be Boeing's showcase exhibit at the 1933 Chicago World's Fair.

The cockpit windshield of the first 247s was angled forward, instead of the conventional aft sweep. This was the design solution, similar to that adopted by other contemporary aircraft, to the problem of lighted control panel instruments reflecting off the windshield at night, but it turned out that the forward-sloping windshield would reflect ground lights instead, especially during landings, and it also increased drag slightly. By the introduction of the 247D, the windshield was sloped aft in the usual way, and the night-glare problem was resolved by installing an extension (the glarescreen) over the control panel.

Boeing considered safety features carefully, building in structural strength and incorporating design elements that enhanced passenger comfort and well-being, such as the thermostatically controlled, air conditioned, and sound-deadened cabin. The crew included a pilot and copilot, as well as a flight attendant (then known as a "stewardess"), who could tend to passenger needs. The main landing gear did not fully retract; a portion of the wheels extended below the nacelles, typical of designs of the time, as a means of reducing structural damage in a wheels-up landing. The tailwheel was not retractable. While the Model 247 and 247A had speed-ring engine cowlings and fixed-pitch propellers, the Model 247D incorporated NACA cowlings and variable-pitch propellers.

Operational history

As the 247 emerged from its test and development phase, the company further showcased its capabilities by entering a long-distance air race in 1934, the MacRobertson Air Race from England to Australia. During the 1930s, aircraft designs were often proven in air races and other aerial contests. A modified 247D was entered, flown by Colonel Roscoe Turner and Clyde Pangborn. The 247, race number "57", was essentially a production model, but all airliner furnishings were removed to accommodate eight additional fuselage fuel tanks. The MacRobertson Air Race attracted aircraft entries from all over the globe, including both prototypes and established production types, with the grueling course considered an excellent proving ground, as well as an opportunity to gain worldwide attention. Turner and Pangborn came in second place in the transport section (and third overall), behind the Boeing 247's eventual rival, the new Douglas DC-2.

Being the winner of the 1934 U.S. Collier Trophy for excellence in aviation design, the first 247 production orders were earmarked for William Boeing's airline Boeing Air Transport. The 247 was capable of crossing the United States from east to west eight hours faster than its predecessors, such as the Ford Trimotor and Curtiss Condor. Entering service on May 22, 1933, a Boeing Air Transport 247 set a cross-country record of  hours on its San Francisco to New York City inaugural flight.

Boeing sold the first 60 247s, an unprecedented $3.5 million order, to its affiliated airline, Boeing Air Transport (part of the United Aircraft and Transport Corporation, UATC), at a unit price of $65,000. TWA (Transcontinental & Western Air) also ordered the 247, but UATC declined the order, which resulted in TWA President Jack Frye setting out requirements for a new airliner and funding Don Douglas to design and build the Douglas DC-1 prototype. Douglas eventually developed the design into the DC-3.

The Boeing design had been the first to enter series production, but the 247 proved to have some serious deficiencies. Airlines considered its limited capacity a drawback, since it carried only 10 passengers, in five rows with a seat on each side of the aisle, as well as a stewardess. Compared to the more spacious DC-2 and later DC-3, the passenger count was too few to make it a commercially viable airliner. Another feature influencing passenger comfort was that the 247's main wing spar ran through the cabin, so persons moving through the cabin had to step over it. The Lockheed Model 10 Electra had a similar configuration, and while it was a more compact design, the Electra managed to carry the same number of passengers at a slightly better overall performance, and at a lower cost-per-mile.

Seventy-five 247s were built; Douglas collected 800 civil orders for DC-3s before the Pearl Harbor attack, and produced over 10,000 DC-3s, including wartime production of C-47s, while the rival Lockheed Electra "family" was eventually to reach over 3,000 in its various civil and military variants. Boeing Air Transport bought 60 examples, United Aircraft Corp. 10, Lufthansa ordered three, but only two were delivered, and one went to a private owner in China. While the industry primarily standardized on Boeing's competitors, many of United's aircraft were later purchased by Western Air Express at "bargain-basement prices".

The 247 remained in airline service until World War II, when several were converted into C-73 transports and trainers. The Royal Canadian Air Force's 121 Squadron operated seven 247Ds as medium transports during the early part of the war. One of these aircraft was donated to the Royal Air Force (RAF) for radar testing, where it was renumbered DZ203. DZ203 was passed among several units in the RAF before being used to make the world's first fully automatic blind landing on 16 January 1945.

Warlord "Young Marshal" Zhang Xueliang ordered two Boeing 247Ds for his air force. He  used one of them, named Bai-Ying (White Eagle), during the Xi'an incident in 1936, during which he flew into the opposing Nationalist army's camp at Sian (now rendered as Xi'an) under a secret truce, and had their leader, Generalissimo Chiang Kai-shek, arrested, ending the civil war between the Communist and Nationalist armies, so they could fight together against the Japanese invaders.

A number of specially modified variants included a Boeing 247Y appropriated from United for Air Corps use as a test aircraft fitted with two machine guns in the nose.  The same installation later was fitted to a 247Y owned by Generalissimo Chiang Kai-shek. This aircraft also featured a Colt   machine gun in a flexible mount. A 247D purchased by the British RAF became a testbed for instrument approach equipment and received a nonstandard nose, new powerplants, and fixed landing gear. Some 247s were still flying in the late 1960s as cargo transports and business aircraft.

The Turner/Pangborn 247D still exists. Originally flown on September 5, 1934, it was leased from United Airlines for the 1934 MacRobertson Air Race and returned to United, where it served in regular airline service until 1937. Subsequently, the 247D was sold to the Union Electric Company of St. Louis for use as an executive transport. The Air Safety Board purchased the aircraft in 1939 and it remained in use for 14 years before it was donated to the National Air and Space Museum, Washington, DC. It is displayed today with two sets of markings, the left side is marked as NR257Y, in Colonel Turner's 1934 MacRobertson Air Race colors, while the right side is painted in United Airlines livery, as NC13369.

Variants

Model 280
Original proposal of Boeing 247 with 14 seats and  P&W Hornet engines
Model 247
Twin-engined civil transport airliner, initial production version
247A
Powered by new  P&W Wasp, on special order for Deutsche Luft Hansa in 1934
247E
This designation was given to the first Boeing 247 aircraft, it was used to test a number improvements that were later incorporated into the Boeing 247D.
247D
Original one-off was a race aircraft designed for the MacRobertson Air Race; use of Hamilton Standard  variable-pitch propellers allowed for a  gain; the 247D configuration incorporated in production series bearing the same name.
247Y
Armed version, one exported to China, second used for trials
C-73
Designation for Boeing 247D airliners "drafted" into military service in USAAF, 27 in total

Operators

Civil operators

 Viação Aérea Bahiana operated one aircraft.

 Canadian Pacific Airlines
 Quebec Airways

 Private owner operated one aircraft.

 Avianca as SCADTA operated 10 aircraft.

 Lufthansa operated one aircraft and used a second for spares/testing.

 Boeing Air Transport (later United Air Lines) operated 60 aircraft.
 Empire Air Lines
 National Parks Airways
 Pennsylvania Central Airlines
 United Aircraft Corporation operated 10 aircraft.
 Wien Air Alaska
 Western Air Express, the predecessor of Western Airlines, received some of ex-United Aircraft Corporation aircraft.
 Woodley Airways
 Wyoming Air Service

Military operators

 Royal Canadian Air Force

 Royal Air Force

 United States Army Air Corps

Specifications (Boeing 247D)

Accidents and incidents
October 10, 1933United Air Lines 247, NC13304 (c/n 1685), was probably the first victim of sabotage of a commercial airliner. The aircraft, en route from Cleveland to Chicago, was destroyed by a nitroglycerin-based explosive device over Chesterton, Indiana. All seven on board were killed.
November 9, 1933A Pacific Air Transport 247, NC13345 (c/n 1727), crashed on takeoff after the pilot became disoriented in fog and low visibility; four of ten on board died.
November 24, 1933A National Air Transport 247, NC13324 (c/n 1705), was being ferried from Chicago to Kansas City when it crashed near Wedron, Illinois, killing all three crew.
February 23, 1934 A United Air Lines 247, NC13357 (c/n 1739), crashed in Parley's Canyon in fog near Salt Lake City, killing all eight on board.
December 20, 1934 United Air Lines Flight 6, a 247 (NC13328, c/n 1709), struck a tree and crashed near Western Springs, Illinois, due to carburetor icing; all four on board survived. The aircraft involved was repaired and converted to 247D standard in July 1935 and returned to service; the aircraft was pressed into USAAF service in 1942 and redesignated as C-73 with tail number 42-57210. The aircraft was damaged in a wind storm at Duncan Field, Texas, on August 30, 1942, and was written off.
March 24, 1935 The sole 247 operated by Lufthansa (D-AGAR, c/n 1945) was damaged beyond economical repair in a collision with an Air France aircraft on the ground at Nuremberg and then scrapped
September 1, 1935Western Air Express 247, NC13314 (c/n 1695), was being ferried from Burbank, California, to Saugus, California, when it struck high tension power lines after takeoff, killing all three on board.
Three crew and nine passengers killed, there were no survivors.
October 30, 1935United Air Lines Boeing 247D, NC13323 (c/n 1704), crashed during an instrument checkflight near Cheyenne, killing the four crew members aboard.
December 15, 1936Seven died when Western Air Express Flight 6, a 247D, en route from Burbank, California, to Salt Lake City via Las Vegas, crashed just below Hardy Ridge on Lone Peak in Utah. The major parts of the aircraft were hurled over the ridge and fell over  into a basin below.
December 27, 1936 United Airlines Trip 34, a 247D (c/n 1737), crashed at the head of Rice Canyon, Los Angeles County, California, due to pilot error; all 12 on board died.
January 12, 1937 Western Air Express Flight 7, a 247D (c/n 1696) flight from Salt Lake City to Burbank, crashed into a mountain near Newhall, California, killing five. Among the dead was Martin Johnson of Martin and Osa Johnson fame (adventurers, authors, and documentary filmmakers).
August 13, 1937 A 247 being operated by the Luftwaffe's proving ground at Rechlin (formerly D-AKIN of Lufthansa, c/n 1944) crashed at Hannover, Germany, during a test flight, killing seven of eight on board. The aircraft was being used as a testbed for an experimental autopilot.
March 13, 1939 A SCADTA 247D, C-149, crashed near Manzanares, Caldas, Colombia, killing all eight on board.
February 27, 1940 A SCADTA 247D, C-140, struck El Mortino mountain near Tona, Santander, Colombia, killing all 11 on board.
July 30, 1942A Northwest Airlines C-73, 42-68639 (c/n 1717, former NC13335), crashed and burned on takeoff from Wold Chamberlain Field, near Minneapolis, Minnesota, killing all 10 on board.

Surviving aircraft

c/n 1699, CF-JRQ
Exhibited in Canada Aviation and Space Museum, Ottawa. Donated to the museum in 1967 by California Standard Oil of Calgary, Alberta.

c/n 1722, N18E
Exhibited in the National Museum of Science and Industry, Wroughton, UK

c/n 1729, N13347
Still airworthy, flown after restoration at the Museum of Flight Restoration Center, Paine Field, Snohomish County, Washington, USA, to the Museum of Flight main facility on 26 April 2016 where it was subsequently installed in that museum's Air Park.

c/n 1953, NC13369 / NR257Y
Exhibited in the Hall of Air Transportation at the National Air and Space Museum, Washington, D.C., USA, with United Air Lines colors and registration as NC13369 on its right fuselage and wing and as NR257Y with MacRobertson Air Race markings on its left side.

Notable appearances in media

See also

Notes

Bibliography

 Bowers, Peter M. Boeing aircraft since 1916. London: Putnam Aeronautical Books, 1989. .
 Bryan, C.D.B.  The National Air and Space Museum. New York: Harry N. Abrams, Inc., 1979. .
 Fernandez, Ronald. Excess Profits: The Rise of United Technologies. Boston, Massachusetts: Addison-Wesley, 1983. .
 Gould, William. Boeing (Business in Action). Bath, Avon, UK: Cherrytree Books, 1995. .
 Mondey, David, The Concise Guide to American Aircraft of World War II. London: Chancellor, 1996. .
 Pearcy, Arthur. Douglas Propliners: DC-1–DC-7. Shrewsbury, UK: Airlife Publishing, 1995. .
 Pedigree of Champions: Boeing Since 1916, Third Edition. Seattle, Washington: The Boeing Company, 1969. No ISBN. WorldCat.
 Seely, Victor. "Boeing's Grand Old Lady." Air Classics, Vol. 4, No. 6, August 1968.
 Serling, Robert J. Legend & Legacy: The Story of Boeing and its People. New York: St. Martin's Press, 1992. .
 Taylor, H. A. "Boeing's Trend-Setting 247". Air Enthusiast, No. 9, February–May 1979, pp. 43–54. .
 Taylor, H. A. "Talkback". Air Enthusiast, No. 10, July–September 1979, p. 80. 
 van der Linden, F. Robert. The Boeing 247: The First Modern Airliner. Seattle, Washington: University of Washington Press, 1991. . Retrieved: July 26, 2009.
 Yenne, Bill. Boeing: Planemaker to the World. New York:, Crescent Books, 1989. .

External links

 Boeing: Historical Snapshot: Model 247/C-73 Transport
 Film of United Airlines Boeing 247 NC13364 taking off from Vancouver Airport 1934 
 Gallery: Boeing 247 Images, including two of the interior and one of the retracted main gear
 Boeing Model 247: First modern airliner
 "From Mock Up To Latest Airliner," Popular Mechanics, October 1932, early article on future Model 247
 "Keeping Them In The Air" Popular Mechanics, July 1935 photos and colored artwork of 247 pp.9–16

247
1930s United States airliners
Low-wing aircraft
Aircraft first flown in 1933
Twin piston-engined tractor aircraft